Emir of Qatar Cup, also known as the Emir Cup, but changed to Amir Cup starting in 2019, is an association football tournament played every season by 18 first and second division teams. The most successful is Al Sadd who won the tournament 18 times. Emir of Qatar Cup was played for the first time in 1972, and was won by Al Ahli.

History

Al Ahli SC won the first ever Emir of Qatar Cup, defeating Al-Rayyan SC 6-1 under the leadership of Sudanese coach Mohammed Kheiri. Till this day, it is the joint-largest scoreline ever recorded in an Emir Cup final. It was refereed by Ali al-Absi, while Abdullah Siddiqi scored the first ever goal in an Emir Cup final. Two years later, Al Ahli were denied another Emir Cup title in a tight match against Al-Sadd SC which Al Sadd won 4–3. In this match, the first ever hat-trick in an Emir Cup was scored by Iranian player Qassim Falah who played for Al Ahli.

The first ever Emir Cup final to be broadcast on color television was the 1975 final which took place in Al-Ahly Stadium. It was commentated by Qatari Mohammed Nuah.

The largest scoring match in the Emir Cup took place in 1981/82 between Al Sadd and Al-Shamal SC. Al Shamal were defeated 16–2.

1991/92 is the only season to ever be held in an away/home format. Al Ahli SC won that year, defeating Al-Rayyan SC.

In the 1992/93 edition, the tournament saw a record number of red cards handed out - Al Sadd players received 4 red cards, while Al-Arabi SC only received 1. Al Arabi won the match 3-0 thanks to a brace by Khalifa Salem and a goal by Edison.

Ali Absi was the first foreign referee to officiate a match in the first edition of the Emir Cup.

The Emir Cup has undergone format changes since it was first played in the early 70s. In 1999, it was decide to include Second Division sides along with the top-tier teams playing for Qatar national league title. In 2004, the tournament was plane in such a manner that the event would last five stages.

Previous winners

1972–73: Al Ahli 6–1 Al Rayyan
1973–74: Qatar SC 2–1 Al Sadd
1974–75: Al Sadd 4–3 Al Ahli
1975–76: Qatar SC 4–3 Al Arabi
1976–77: Al Sadd 1–0 Al-Rayyan
1977–78: Al Arabi 5–1 Al Wakrah Club
1978–79: Al Arabi 3–1 Al Wakrah Club
1979–80: Al Arabi 2–1 Al-Khor
1980–81: Al Ahli 2–1 Qatar SC 
1981–82: Al Sadd 2–1 Al-Rayyan
1982–83: Al Arabi 1–0 Al Sadd
1983–84: Al Arabi 3–2 Al Ahli
1984–85: Al Sadd 2–1 Al Ahli
1985–86: Al Sadd 2–0 Al Arabi
1986–87: Al Ahli 2–0 Al Sadd
1987–88: Al Sadd 4–3 Al Wakrah Club
1988–89: Al Arabi 2–0 Qatar SC
1989–90: Al Arabi 3–0 Al Wakrah Club
1990–91: Al Sadd 1–0 Al-Rayyan
1991–92: Al Ahli 2–1 Al Rayyan
1992–93: Al Arabi 3–0 Al Sadd
1993–94: Al Sadd 3–2 Al Arabi
1994–95: Al-Gharafa 2–1 Al Wakrah Club
1995–96: Al-Gharafa 5–2 Al-Rayyan
1996–97: Al-Gharafa 1–1 Al-Rayyan (aet, 3–2 pens)
1997–98: Al-Gharafa 4–3 Al Ahli
1998–99: Al Rayyan 2–1 Al-Gharrafa
1999–2000: Al Sadd 2–0 Al-Rayyan
2000–01: Al Sadd 3–2 Qatar SC
2001–02: Al-Gharafa 4–1 Al Sadd
2002–03: Al Sadd 2–1 Al Ahli
2003–04: Al Rayyan 3–2 Qatar SC
2004–05: Al Sadd 0–0 Al Wakrah Club (aet, 5–4 pens)
2005–06: Al Rayyan 1–1 Al-Gharafa (aet, 5–3 pens)
2006–07: Al Sadd 0–0 Al-Khor (aet, 5–4 pens)
2007–08: Umm-Salal Sports Club 2–2 Al-Gharafa (aet, 4–1 pens)
2009: Al-Gharafa 2–1 Al Rayyan
2010: Al Rayyan 1–0 Umm-Salal Sports Club
2011: Al Rayyan 2–1 Al-Gharafa
2012: Al-Gharafa 0–0 Al Sadd (aet, 4–3 pens)
2013: Al Rayyan 2–1 Al Sadd
2014: Al Sadd 3–0 Al-Sailiya
2015: Al Sadd 2–1 El Jaish
2016: Lekhwiya SC 2–2 Al-Sadd SC (aet, 4–2 pens)
2017: Al Sadd 2–1 Al Rayyan 
2018: Al-Duhail 2–1 Al Rayyan 
2019: Al-Duhail 4–1 Al Sadd 
2020: Al Sadd 2–1 Al-Arabi
2021: Al Sadd 1–1 Al Rayyan (aet, 5–4 pens)
2022: Al-Duhail 5–1 Al-Gharafa

Statistics

Referees of finals

1972–73 :  Ali Absi
1973–74 :  Ahed Shanti
1974–75 :  Ahed Shanti
1975–76 :  Taleb Ballan
1976–77 :  Taleb Ballan
1977–78 :  Mubarak Walid
1978–79 :  Taleb Ballan
1979–80 :  Mubarak Walid
1980–81 :  Taleb Ballan
1981–82 :  Mustafa Ezzat
1982–83 :  Mustafa Ezzat
1983–84 :  Mohammed Al Mulla
1984–85 :  Hassan Al Mulla
1985–86 :  Juman Salem
1986–87 :  Ibrahim Buahuan
1987–88 :  Hassan Al Mulla
1988–89 :  Ibrahim Buahuan
1989–90 :  Hassan Al Mulla
1990–91 :  Ibrahim Buahuan
1991–92 :  Omar Al-Muhanna
1992–93 :  Rashid Mujeebi
1993–94 :  Ibrahim Al Kaabi
1994–95 :  Hassan Jowhar
1995–96 :  Jumaa Ali
1996–97 :  Jassim Mohammed Al Hail

1997–98 :  Jassim Al Khouri
1998–99 :  Abdulla Al Qahtani
1999–2000 :  Jassim Mohammed Al Hail
2000–01 :  Said Belqola
2001–02 :  Graham Barber
2002–03 :  Pierluigi Collina
2003–04 :  Markus Merk
2004–05 :  Steve Bennett
2005–06 :  Graham Poll
2006–07 :  Roberto Rosetti
2007–08 :  Ľuboš Micheľ
2009 :  Roberto Rosetti
2010 :  Frank De Bleeckere
2011 :  Viktor Kassai
2012 :  Damir Skomina
2013 :  Abdulrahman Abdou
2014 :  Khamis Al-Marri
2015 :  Khamis Al-Kuwari
2016 :  Salman Falahi
2017 :  Gianluca Rocchi
2018 :  Abdulrahman Al Jassim
2019 :  Abdulrahman Al Jassim
2020 :  Saoud Al-Adhbah
2021 :  Abdullah Al Athbah
2022 :  Abdulhadi Al Ruaile

Winning club captains
Source: alarab.qa

1972–73 :  Mohammed Ghanim Al Rumaihi
1973–74 :  Mubarak Walid Said
1974–75 :  Obeid Jumaa
1975–76 :  Salman Faraj
1976–77 :  Mubarak Anber
1977–78 :  Majid Al Sayegh
1978–79 :  Majid Al Sayegh
1979–80 :  Abdullah Saad Al Sulaiti
1980–81 :  Hussein Khawaja
1981–82 :  Mubarak Anber
1982–83 :  Abdullah Saad Al Sulaiti
1983–84 :  Abdullah Saad Al Sulaiti
1984–85 :  Mubarak Anber
1985–86 :  Mubarak Anber
1986–87 :  Adel Malallah
1987–88 :  Yousef Al Adsani
1988–89 :  Ibrahim Khalfan
1989–90 :  Nasser Mohammed Al-Hitmi
1990–91 :  Yousef Al Adsani
1991–92 :  Adel Malallah
1992–93 :  Mohammed Dahham Al Suwaidi
1993–94 :  Yousef Al Adsani
1994–95 :  Adel Khamis
1995–96 :  Adel Khamis
1996–97 :  Adel Khamis

1997–98 :  Adel Khamis
1998–99 :  Younis Ahmed
1999–2000 :  Abdulnasser Al-Obaidly
2000–01 :  Abdulnasser Al-Obaidly
2001–02 :  Amer Al Kaabi
2002–03 :  Jafal Rashed Al-Kuwari
2003–04 :  Fernando Hierro
2004–05 :  Jafal Rashed Al-Kuwari
2005–06 :  Abdulrahman Al-Kuwari
2006–07 :  Jafal Rashed Al-Kuwari
2007–08 :  Aziz Ben Askar
2009 :  Saad Al-Shammari
2010 :  Marcelo Tavares
2011 :  Fábio César
2012 :  Otmane El Assas
2013 :  Fábio César
2014 :  Raúl
2015 :  Talal Al-Bloushi
2016 :  Karim Boudiaf
2017 :  Xavi
2018 :  Karim Boudiaf
2019 :  Mohammed Musa
2020 :  Hassan Al-Haydos
2021 :  Hassan Al-Haydos
2022 :  Almoez Ali

Club managers in finals
Statistics accurate as of 6 September 2022.

1972–73 :  Mohammed Kheiri (Al Ahli) def.  Salem Ashour (Al Rayyan)
1973–74 :  Wagdi Jamal (Qatar SC) def.  Said Musa (Al Sadd)
1974–75 :  Hassan Osman (Al Sadd) def.  Ali Attar (Al Ahli)
1975–76 :  Mohammed Kheiri (Qatar SC) def.  Wagdi Jamal (Al Arabi)
1976–77 :  Hassan Osman (Al Sadd) def.  Youssef Saleh (Al Rayyan)
1977–78 :  Abdul Ameer Zainal (Al Arabi) def.  Wagdi Jamal (Al Wakrah)
1978–79 :  Silas (Al Arabi) def.  Carlos Alberto (Al Wakrah)
1979–80 :  Silas (Al Arabi) def.  Ronald Douglas (Al Khor)
1980–81 :  Helmi Hussein (Al Ahli) def.  Park Byung-suk (Qatar SC)
1981–82 :  Hassan Osman (Al Sadd) def.  Abdel Moneim Al Haj (Al Rayyan)
1982–83 :  Procópio Cardoso (Al Arabi) def.  Jimmy Meadows (Al Sadd)
1983–84 :  Sebastião (Al Arabi) def.  Eid Mubarak (Al Ahli)
1984–85 :  Hassan Osman (Al Sadd) def.  Eid Mubarak (Al Ahli)
1985–86 :  Procópio Cardoso (Al Sadd) def.   Sebastião (Al Arabi)
1986–87 :  Joubert Meira (Al Ahli) def.  Procópio Cardoso (Al Sadd)
1987–88 :  Ahmed Omar (Al Sadd) def.  Len Ashurst (Al Wakrah)
1988–89 :  Joseph Bowie (Al Arabi) def.  Paulo Massa (Qatar SC)
1989–90 :  Luis Alberto (Al Arabi) def.  Hassan Ali (Al Wakrah)
1990–91 :  Silas (Al Sadd) def.  René Simões (Al Rayyan)
1991–92 :  Paulo Massa (Al Ahli) def.  Luis Alberto (Al Rayyan)
1992–93 :  Zé Mário (Al Arabi) def.  Sebastião Lapola (Al Sadd)
1993–94 :  Ahmed Omar (Al Sadd) def.  René Simões (Al Arabi)
1994–95 :  Jamal Haji (Al Gharafa) def.  Adnan Dirjal (Al Wakrah)
1995–96 :  Jamal Haji (Al Gharafa) def.  Benny Johansen (Al Rayyan)
1996–97 :  Jamal Haji (Al Gharafa) def.  Eid Mubarak (Al Rayyan)

1997–98 :  Jamal Haji (Al Gharafa) def.  Abdelkadir Bomir (Al Ahli)
1998–99 :  Roald Poulsen (Al Rayyan) def.  Jamal Haji (Al Gharafa)
1999–2000 :  Džemaludin Mušović (Al Sadd) def.  Jørgen E. Larsen (Al Rayyan)
2000–01 :  René Meulensteen (Al Sadd) def.  Verner Lička (Qatar SC)
2001–02 :  Josef Hickersberger (Al Gharafa) def.  Ilie Balaci (Al Sadd)
2002–03 :  Luka Peruzović (Al Sadd) def.  Carlos Alhinho (Al Ahli)
2003–04 :  Jean Castaneda (Al Rayyan) def.  Džemaludin Mušović (Qatar SC)
2004–05 :  Bora Milutinović (Al Sadd) def.  Adnan Dirjal (Al Wakrah)
2005–06 :  Rabah Madjer (Al Rayyan) def.  Harres Mohammed (Al Gharafa)
2006–07 :  Jorge Fossati (Al Sadd) def.  Jean-Paul Rabier (Al Khor)
2007–08 :  Laurent Banide (Umm Salal) def.  Marcos Paquetá (Al Gharafa)
2008–09 :  Marcos Paquetá (Al Gharafa) def.  Paulo Autuori (Al Rayyan)
2009–10 :  Paulo Autuori (Al Rayyan) def.  Gérard Gili (Umm Salal)
2010–11 :  Paulo Autuori (Al Rayyan) def.  Bruno Metsu (Al Gharafa)
2011–12 :  Paulo Silas (Al Gharafa) def.  Jorge Fossati (Al Sadd)
2012–13 :  Diego Aguirre (Al Rayyan) def.  Hussein Ammouta (Al Sadd)
2013–14 :  Hussein Ammouta (Al Sadd) def.  Sami Trabelsi (Al Sailiya)
2014–15 :  Sabri Lamouchi (El Jaish SC) def  Hussein Ammouta (Al Sadd SC)
2015–16 :  Jesualdo Ferreira (Al Sadd SC) def  Djamel Belmadi (Al Duhail SC)
2016–17 :  Michael Laudrup (Al Rayyan SC) def  Jesualdo Ferreira (Al Sadd SC)
2017–18 :  Michael Laudrup (Al Rayyan SC) def  Djamel Belmadi (Al Duhail SC)
2018–19 :  Jesualdo Ferreira (Al Sadd SC) def  Rui Faria (Al Duhail SC)
2019–20 :  Heimir Hallgrimsson (Al Arabi SC) def  Xavi (Al Sadd SC)
2020–21 :  Laurent Blanc (Al Rayyan SC) def  Xavi (Al Duhail SC)
2021–22 :  Andrea Stramaccioni (Al Gharafa SC) def  Luís Castro (Al Duhail SC)

Top-Performing Clubs

References 
Qatar Cup Results at Super.ae

External links
 Qatar Football Association - QFA
 Emir Cup - Soccerway

1
National association football cups